Pitch is the number of (monospaced) letters, numbers and spaces in  of , that is, characters per inch (abbreviated cpi), measured horizontally. The pitch was most often used as a measurement of the size of typewriter fonts as well as those of impact printers used with computers.

The most widespread fonts in typewriters are 10 and 12 pitch, called Pica and Elite, respectively. Both fonts have the same x-height, yielding six lines per vertical inch. There may be other font styles with various width: condensed or compressed (17–20 cpi), italic or bold (10 pitch), enlarged (5–8 cpi), and so on.

See also
 Copyfitting Estimating the average number of characters per line for a proportionately spaced font.
 
 
 Proportional spacingA proportional typeface contains glyphs of varying widths, while a monospaced (non-proportional or fixed-width) typeface uses a single standard width for all glyphs in the font. Consequently, the pitch of a proportionally spaced font is undefined.

References

External links
 

Typewriters